Eurhynchium striatum is a species of moss belonging to the family Brachytheciaceae.

It is native to Europe.

References

Hypnales